Health Sciences/Jubilee station is an Edmonton Light Rail Transit station in Edmonton, Alberta, Canada. It serves both the Capital Line and the Metro Line. As of 2021, it is the southern terminus of the Metro Line.  It is a ground-level station located at 114 Street at 83 Avenue on the University of Alberta's main campus.

History

Health Sciences station opened on January 3, 2006, and was the second LRT station built on the south side of the North Saskatchewan River. It was also the first above ground station to be built since Clareview station which opened in 1981 and the first station built as part of the Capital Line's South expansion which added five new stations and 7.8 km of track to the system by 2010.

Station layout
The station has a 124-metre long centre loading platform that can accommodate two five-car LRT trains at the same time, with one train on each side of the platform. The platform is exactly nine metres wide.

An enclosed pedway system that connects the station with the Edmonton Clinic Health Academy, Kaye Edmonton Clinic and University of Alberta Hospital opened in June 2013.

The station's platform features text etched into the glass walls and footprint impressions in the concrete as part of the public art piece "I Witness" by Holly Newman.

The station has one termination track that allows Metro Line trains to terminate, the platform is off-limits to the public.  The platform allows one 3 car Metro Line train to terminate/reverse.

Around the station
Walter C. Mackenzie Health Sciences Centre
Mazankowski Alberta Heart Institute
Stollery Children's Hospital
University of Alberta Hospital
Northern Alberta Jubilee Auditorium
Aberhart Centre
Canadian Blood Services (Edmonton Clinic) 
Cross Cancer Institute
Kaye Edmonton Clinic 
University of Alberta
Clinical Sciences Building
Corbett Hall
Edmonton Clinic Health Academy (ECHA)
Katz Group Centre
Li Ka Shing Centre 
Lister Centre
Medical Sciences
Research Transition Facility
Windsor Park

References

Edmonton Light Rail Transit stations
Railway stations in Canada opened in 2006
Railway stations in Canada at university and college campuses
Capital Line
Metro Line